Mortgage interest relief at source, or MIRAS, was a scheme introduced in the United Kingdom from 1983 in a bid to encourage home ownership; it allowed borrowers tax relief for interest payments on their mortgage. Previously tax had to be reclaimed from HMRC. 

In the 1983 Budget Geoffrey Howe raised the tax allowance from £25,000 to £30,000. Unmarried couples with joint mortgages could pool their allowances to £60,000, a provision known as Multiple Mortgage Tax Relief. This remained in place until the 1988 Budget, when Nigel Lawson ended the option to pool allowances from August 1988. Lawson later publicly expressed regret at not having implemented the change with effect from the time of the budget, as it is generally accepted that the rush to beat the deadline fuelled a sharp increase in house prices.

MIRAS was completely abolished in April 2000 by Gordon Brown, who argued it had become a middle class perk.

Receiving MIRAS was one of the justifications given by mortgage advisers when selling endowment mortgages.

There is a similar scheme in the Republic of Ireland, although not available for mortgages drawn down after 2013.

References

See also 
UK mortgage terminology

History of taxation in the United Kingdom
Interest Relief at Source